The 1897 Duquesne Country and Athletic Club football season was the third season of competition for the American football team representing the Duquesne Country and Athletic Club of Pittsburgh, Pennsylvania. Led by captain and manager Ed Young, the team compiled a record of 8–3.

Schedule

References

Duquesne Country and Athletic Club
Duquesne Country and Athletic Club seasons
Duquesne Country and Athletic Club